William Edward Hickey (September 19, 1927 – June 29, 1997) was an American actor. He is best known for his Academy Award-nominated role as Don Corrado Prizzi in the John Huston film Prizzi's Honor (1985), as well as Uncle Lewis in National Lampoon's Christmas Vacation (1989) and the voice of Dr. Finklestein in Tim Burton's The Nightmare Before Christmas (1993).

Early life
Hickey was born in Brooklyn, New York, the son of Edward and Nora Hickey, both of Irish descent. He had an older sister, Dorothy Finn. Hickey began acting on radio in 1938.

He grew up in Flatbush, Brooklyn, and Richmond Hill, Queens.

Career
Hickey had a long, distinguished career in film, television and stage. He began his career as a child actor on the variety stage and made his Broadway debut as a walk-on in the 1951 production of George Bernard Shaw's Saint Joan, starring Uta Hagen. He performed often during the golden age of television, including appearances on Studio One and Philco Playhouse. His most important contribution to the arts, however, remains his teaching career at the HB Studio in Greenwich Village, founded by Herbert Berghof. George Segal, Jeanie Columbo, Sandy Dennis, Barbra Streisand, Cyprienne Gabel and Sandra McClain all studied under him. He kept a flask behind the sink in the basement studio of HB where he taught. He stated it helped him cope with bad acting. He was a staple of Ben Bagley's New York musical revues, he can be heard on several of the recordings, notably Decline and Fall of the Entire World as Seen Through the Eyes of Cole Porter.

Hickey enjoyed a career in film, television and theater. In addition to his work as an actor, he was a respected teacher of the craft. Notable for his unique, gravelly voice and somewhat offbeat appearance, Hickey, in his later years, was often cast in "cantankerous-but-clever old man" roles. His characters, who sometimes exuded an underlying air of the macabre, usually had the last laugh over their more sprightly co-stars. One of his early roles was a suspect in the 1968 film The Boston Strangler.

His most notable onscreen role was that of the gravelly voiced Don Corrado Prizzi in Prizzi's Honor (1985), for which he was nominated for the Academy Award for Best Supporting Actor. Hickey portrayed Don Corrado as sharp-witted and cunning, despite his frail physical state, and shared key scenes with Anjelica Huston and Jack Nicholson.

Death
Hickey died from emphysema and bronchitis in 1997. His remains are interred in the Cemetery of the Evergreens in Brooklyn.  He died during the filming of Uzo's Better Than Ever, and his role was played by the producer in a pick-up shot depicting his character in the hospital.  His final movie, Knocking on Death's Door (in which he plays the town sheriff), was released nearly two years after his death. The movie Mouse Hunt (in which he also appeared) is dedicated to his memory.

Notable credits

New York City theatre
Miss Lonelyhearts (1957)
The Body Beautiful (1958)
Happy Birthday, Wanda June (1970)
Small Craft Warnings (1972)
Mourning Becomes Electra (1972)
Thieves (1974)
Arsenic and Old Lace (1986)

Film

A Hatful of Rain (1957) – Apples (film debut)
Operation Mad Ball (1957) – G.I. Sampson (uncredited)
Something Wild (1961) – Bit Part (uncredited)
Invitation to a Gunfighter (1964) – Jo-Jo
The Producers (1967) – The Drunk in bar (credited as "Bill Hickey")
The Boston Strangler (1968) – Eugene T O'Rourke
Little Big Man (1970) – Historian
A New Leaf (1971) – Smith (uncredited)
The Telephone Book (1971) – Man in Bed
Happy Birthday, Wanda June (1971) – Looseleaf Harper
92 In The Shade (1975) – Mr. Skelton
Mikey & Nicky (1976) – Sid Fine
The Sentinel (1977) – Perry, a shady locksmith
Nunzio (1978)
Wise Blood (1979) – Preacher
A Stranger Is Watching (1982) – Maxi
Prizzi's Honor (1985) – Don Corrado Prizzi
Walls of Glass (1985) – Papa
Remo Williams: The Adventure Begins (1985) – The Coney Island Barker
One Crazy Summer (1986) –  Old Man Beckersted
Seize the Day (1986) – Perls
Stranded (1986, TV movie) - Mr. Pierson 
The Name of the Rose (1986) – Ubertino da Casale
A Hobo's Christmas (1987, TV movie) – Cincinnati Harold
Bright Lights, Big City (1988) – Ferret Man
Da (1988) – Drumm
Starlight: A Musical Movie (1988) – Billy Davis
Pink Cadillac (1989) – Mr. Barton
Sea of Love (1989) – Frank Keller, Sr.
Puppet Master (1989) – André Toulon
It Had to Be You (1989) – Schornberg
National Lampoon's Christmas Vacation (1989) – Lewis Griswold (Better known as Uncle Lewis)
Tales from the Darkside: The Movie (1990) – Drogan (in the "Cat From Hell" segment)
Any Man's Death (1990) – Erich Schiller / Ernst Bauricke
My Blue Heaven (1990) – Billy Sparrow
Mob Boss (1990) – Don Anthony
Sons (1990) – Roger
The Runestone (1991) – Lars Hagstrom
The Nightmare Before Christmas (1993) – Doctor Finklestein (voice)
Hey Stranger (1994) – Major-domo
The Jerky Boys: The Movie (1995) – Don 'Uncle Freddy' Frederico
Major Payne (1995) – Dr. Phillips
Forget Paris (1995) – Arthur
The Maddening (1995) – Roy's deceased father 
Love Is All There Is (1996) – Monsignor
Twisted (1996) – Andre
Mouse Hunt (1997) – Rudolf Smuntz (Released posthumously)
Better Than Ever (1997) – Walter (Released posthumously)
Knocking on Death's Door (1999) – Town Sheriff (Released posthumously)
A tekerölantos naplója (1999) (Released posthumously)

Television
Tales from the Darkside (Season three, Episode one, "The Circus")
Tales From The Crypt (Season Two, "The Switch") – Carlton Webster
Baby Talk – Mr. Fogarty
Between Time and Timbuktu – Stony Stevenson
The Equalizer – elderly blind con man
Moonlighting – Mr. Kendall
Miami Vice - (Season 5, "Victims of Circumstance")
The Outer Limits – (Episode "White Light Fever")
Wings – Carlton Blanchard
The Adventures of Pete & Pete – Grandpa Wrigley
Spenser: For Hire – Gus Harley
The Twilight Zone 
Appearances in L.A. Law, The Phil Silvers Show, Tales from the Crypt, Miami Vice, Crime Story, The Tracey Ullman Show, Tales from the Darkside, Spenser: For Hire, The Twilight Zone

Awards

*John Gielgud won both awards for his performances in Plenty and The Shooting Party.

References

External links

1927 births
1997 deaths
American male film actors
American male television actors
Burials at the Cemetery of the Evergreens
Deaths from emphysema
American male voice actors
American people of Irish descent
People from Flatbush, Brooklyn
Male actors from New York City
20th-century American male actors
People from Richmond Hill, Queens
American male child actors